The Psychopathic God: Adolf Hitler is a 1977 book by the historian Robert G. L. Waite. It was republished in 1993 by Da Capo Press of New York.

Origin of the Title
The title is taken from a passage in W. H. Auden's poem, "September 1, 1939":

 Accurate scholarship can
 Unearth the whole offence
 From Luther until now
 That has driven a culture mad,
 Find what occurred at Linz,
 What huge imago made
 A psychopathic God:
 I and the public know
 What all schoolchildren learn,
 Those to whom evil is done
 Do evil in return.

The title of Auden's poem refers to the date that Hitler's tanks rolled into Poland. This date is generally acknowledged as the beginning of World War II.

Citation
Waite, Robert G. L. (1977). The Psychopathic God: Adolf Hitler. New York: Basic Books.

See also
 Psychobiography
 List of Adolf Hitler books

1977 non-fiction books
Books about Adolf Hitler
Basic Books books
Da Capo Press books
English-language books